Bonnerdale is an unincorporated community in Hot Spring County, Arkansas, United States. Bonnerdale has a post office with ZIP code 71933.

Education 
Public education for elementary and secondary school students is provided by the Centerpoint School District, which leads to graduation from Centerpoint High School.

The area also includes Lake Hamilton Public Schools, which leads to graduation from Lake Hamilton High School.

References

Unincorporated communities in Hot Spring County, Arkansas
Unincorporated communities in Arkansas